Doug Priest (born 17 November 1947) is a former  Australian rules footballer who played with South Melbourne in the Victorian Football League (VFL).

Priest began playing for Holbrook in the Farrer Football League in 1962 and was a member of their 1964 premiership team, under Brian Prior. 

After his four years with South Melbourne, he returned to coach Ariah Park - Mirrool in the South West Football League (1970 & 1971), then went to Wagga Tigers Football Club as captain coach in 1972 till 1976, leading them to the 1975 premiership over Henty.

He stayed on at Wagga Tigers and played in their 1977 premiership and also won the Farrer Football League best and fairest award, the Baz Medal.

Notes

External links 

Living people
1947 births
Australian rules footballers from New South Wales
Sydney Swans players